Leptospermum exsertum is a small, sparsely branched shrub that is endemic to Western Australia. It has thick, wedge-shaped to heart-shaped leaves with the narrower end towards the base, often with a sharply pointed tip, white flowers arranged singly or in groups of up to three and fruit that falls off when mature.

Description
There are reddish bracts and bracteoles at the base of the flower, the bracteoles falling off as the flower opens.

Taxonomy and naming
Leptospermum exsertum was first formally described in 1989 by Joy Thompson in the journal Telopea, based on plant material collected by John Stanley Beard near Tardun in 1973. The specific epithet (exsertum) is a Latin word meaning "protruding", refers to the valves of the fruit.

Distribution and habitat
This tea-tree is found on sand plains and sandy heath in the north-west corner of the Avon Wheatbelt biogeographic region.

Conservation status
This species is classified as "Priority One" by the Government of Western Australia Department of Parks and Wildlife, meaning that it is known from only one or a few locations which are potentially at risk.

References

exsertum
Flora of Western Australia
Plants described in 1989
Taxa named by Joy Thompson